Kevin van Wijk (born 17 April 1989) is a Dutch basketball player for Río Ourense Termal of the LEB Oro. Van Wijk played three years college basketball for the Valparaiso Crusaders.

Career
In September 2013, van Wijk signed his first pro-contract with Oviedo CB from the LEB Oro, the second division in Spain. On August 29, 2021, van Wijk re-signed with Río Ourense Termal.

Thanks to his good season, van Wijk was pre-selected with the Netherlands national basketball team.

References

External links
Profile at draftexpress.com
Profile at eurobasket.com
Profile at FEB.es

1989 births
Living people
CB Breogán players
Dutch men's basketball players
Dutch expatriate basketball people in Spain
Dutch expatriate basketball people in the United States
Melilla Baloncesto players
Oviedo CB players
People from Haarlemmermeer
Power forwards (basketball)
Valparaiso Beacons men's basketball players
Sportspeople from North Holland